Carlos Alexandre "Alex" Reis Pinto (born 8 July 1998) is a Portuguese professional footballer who plays for DAC 1904 Dunajská Streda as a defender.

Club career
Born in Guimarães, Pinto made his professional debut in a Segunda Liga match for Vitória Guimarães B against Freamunde on 30 January 2017. He debuted in Primeira Liga as a substitute in Vitória de Guimarães' last league match of the season, on 20 May, against Feirense. On 5 June, he signed a six-season contract with S.L. Benfica.

References

External links
 
 

1998 births
Living people
Sportspeople from Guimarães
Portuguese footballers
Portugal youth international footballers
Association football defenders
Vitória S.C. players
Moreirense F.C. players
Vitória S.C. B players
S.L. Benfica B players
Gil Vicente F.C. players
S.C. Farense players
FC DAC 1904 Dunajská Streda players
Primeira Liga players
Liga Portugal 2 players
Slovak Super Liga players
Expatriate footballers in Slovakia
Portuguese expatriate sportspeople in Slovakia